is a Japanese video game designer, director, producer and writer. He is regarded as an auteur of video games. He developed a strong passion for action/adventure cinema and literature during his childhood and adolescence. In 1986, he was hired by Konami, for which he designed and wrote Metal Gear (1987) for the MSX2, a game that laid the foundations for stealth games and the Metal Gear series, his best known and most appreciated works. He is also known for producing the Zone of the Enders series, as well as writing and designing Snatcher (1988) and Policenauts (1994), graphic adventure games regarded for their cinematic presentation.

Kojima founded Kojima Productions within Konami in 2005, and he was appointed vice president of Konami Digital Entertainment in 2011. Kojima Productions split from Konami in 2015, becoming an independent studio. His studio's first game without Konami, Death Stranding, was released in 2019.

Early life 
Kojima was born on August 24, 1963 in Setagaya, Tokyo. He was the youngest of three children. His father, Kingo, was a pharmacist who frequently traveled on business, and named Kojima after the most common name among doctors he met. When he was four years old, his family moved to Osaka. Describing that stage of his early life, Kojima said it was an abrupt change of environment, and he spent much of his time thereafter indoors, watching television or making figurines. While the family lived in Osaka, his parents began a tradition of the family watching a film together each night, and he was not allowed to go to bed until the film had finished. They were fond of European cinema, westerns, and horror, and did not limit the type of films he was allowed to see.

Kojima took an interest in filmmaking when a friend brought a Super 8 camera to school. They began filming movies together, charging other children 50 yen to see them. Kojima tricked his parents into funding a trip to an island off the coast of Japan without telling them he wanted to film there. Instead of filming, he spent his time swimming, and on the last day changed the plot to being about zombies. He did not show the film to his parents.

By Kojima's teenage years, the family had moved to Kawanishi, Hyōgo, in the Kansai region of Japan. When he was 13 years old, his father died. Kojima has discussed the impact of his father's death in interviews, and the subsequent financial hardship faced by his family. He enrolled at university to study economics, and it was there that he decided to join the video game industry. He wrote fiction while studying, even including a short story in his thesis.

Career

Early career
At the beginning of his career, Kojima was initially searching for a way into film production. He hoped that, if he were to win awards for his written fiction, he would be approached about directing a film. Although Kojima said that he had no friends interested in cinema to encourage him, his friends were not supportive when he announced he intended to enter game development. He would frequently lie about his occupation in the early days of a career, when a word for game designer did not exist in the Japanese language, and instead told people he worked for a financial firm.

Kojima joined video game publisher Konami's MSX home computer division in 1986. He applied to Konami because it was the only games developer listed on the Japanese stock exchange. He was disappointed with the job initially, hoping to make games for the Nintendo Entertainment System, and feeling that the 16 colour palette of the MSX was too restrictive. The first game he worked on was Penguin Adventure, the sequel to Antarctic Adventure, as an assistant director. It significantly expanded upon the gameplay of Antarctic Adventure, adding more action game elements, a greater variety of levels, role-playing elements such as upgrading equipment, and multiple endings. In 2019, Polygon's Julia Lee wrote that for "a game made over 30 years ago, Penguin Adventure had some in-depth features". After Penguin Adventure, Kojima started to design a game called , but the game was canceled when it was found to be too complex to run on the MSX.

Metal Gear and Snatcher (1987–1990) 
Kojima was asked to take over a project, Metal Gear, from a senior associate. Hardware limitations hindered the development of the game's combat, and Kojima altered the gameplay to focus on a prisoner escaping instead of fighting, inspired by The Great Escape. It was released on July 13, 1987, for the MSX2 home computer in Japan, and on September in that year for Europe. The player controls a special forces operative codenamed Solid Snake, who is sent to the fortified state of Outer Heaven to stop a nuclear-equipped walking tank known as "Metal Gear". Metal Gear is one of the earliest examples of the stealth game genre. A port of Metal Gear was released for the NES in 1987, with altered graphics, difficulty, and an abridged ending without the titular weapon. Kojima has openly criticized many of the changes made in the port, including poor translation and the abridged ending. In an interview, a programmer on the NES version of the game said his team were asked to complete the port in only three months, and the NES hardware was not capable of implementing the Metal Gear fight.

His next project was the graphic adventure game Snatcher, released for the NEC PC-8801 and MSX2 computer platforms in Japan on November 26, 1988. Kojima wrote and directed the game. Kojima planned for the game, a graphic adventure with visual novel elements, to have six chapters, but was instructed to trim it down to two. The team wanted to create a third chapter, but were already over the allowed development schedule so were forced to end the game on a cliffhanger. The cyberpunk-influenced game has a semi-open world design. Kojima and character designer Tomiharu Kinoshita treated the project like making a film or anime rather than a game. Former Konami artist Satoshi Yoshoioka designed many of Snatcher's characters, said he was persistently guided by Kojima to make the game as cinematic as possible, which later critics have cited as a staple of his work. Adrian Chen of The New York Times wrote that one of his innovations was "the way he applied cinematic storytelling to console video games". Snatcher draws heavily from Ridley Scott's Blade Runner (1982), and includes enough references that the game strays near copyright infringement. A port for the Sega CD was made without Kojima, but the amount of text and length of the script made localisation expensive and time-consuming, taking three months. Snatcher was modestly successful in Japan, but the western port was a commercial failure, selling only a few thousand units. It has developed a cult following in the west.

In 1990, Kojima wrote a remake of Snatcher, SD Snatcher, a role-playing video game which adapted the storyline of the original Snatcher but significantly changed the environments, details of the plot, and core gameplay mechanics. The "SD" stands for "super deformed" in Japanese media, another way to reference chibi character designs. The characters are depicted in a "super deformed" art style, in contrast to the original game's realistic style. Like the original computer versions of Snatcher, it was only released in Japan. It abandoned random encounters and introduced a first-person turn-based battle system where the player can aim at specific parts of the enemy's body with guns. Such a battle system has rarely been used since, but similar ones can later be found in the role-playing games Square's Vagrant Story (2000), Bethesda Softworks's Fallout 3 (2008), and Nippon Ichi's Last Rebellion (2010). In 2007, J. C. Fletcher of Engadget said that Kojima's choice to stylise the character designs "was some postmodern playfulness from Hideo Kojima [...] downplaying the dramatic aspects of his game and overlaying obvious video game conventions on top of it", and connected that to a similar playfulness in his later games.

Metal Gear 2 and Policenauts (1990–1994) 
The original Metal Gear was a commercial success for its release on the NES, and Konami decided to create a sequel to the game, Snake's Revenge, without the involvement of Kojima. When Kojima was riding on the Tokyo transit system, he was told about Snake's Revenge by a colleague working on the project, who asked him to make a new Snake game of his own. As a result, Kojima began work on his own sequel, Metal Gear 2: Solid Snake, and the two were both released in 1990. Kojima's game would not be released overseas in North America and Europe until its inclusion in Metal Gear Solid 3: Subsistence (2006). Metal Gear 2: Solid Snake was a commercial success. The game has received positive reviews from retro-reviewers. IGN notes that Metal Gear 2 introduced stealth mechanics such as making noise to attract guards, crouching and crawling on the ground, disarming mines, and enemies having view cones.

After memory limitation issues prompted him to take a break during the development of Snatcher, Kojima began to explore concepts for Policenauts. He wanted the game to remain in the adventure genre, feeling it was the best method to express what he wanted with video games. He was also growing frustrated with game development and wanted "a way to take creative control back from the programmers". After the release of Metal Gear 2: Solid Snake (1990), he developed a scripting engine so he could decide when animations and music played instead of the programmers. Development on Policenauts, originally called Beyond, began in 1990, and lasted four years.

Policenauts was released in Japan on July 29, 1994, for the PC-9821. In Japan, critics praised Policenauts for its high level of presentation. Both Sega Saturn Magazine and Famitsu praised the quality of animation, voice acting, and its engrossing setting. Retrospective reviews have regarded the game generally positively, and sought to contextualise Policenauts within Kojima's body of work, as heavily stylized and influenced by films.

Metal Gear Solid subseries and mainstream success (1994–2012) 
In 1994, Kojima began to plan a 3D sequel to Metal Gear 2: Solid Snake, titled Metal Gear Solid and originally planned for release on the 3DO Interactive Multiplayer. After the 3DO was discontinued, development shifted to the Sony PlayStation. For the transition from 2D to 3D graphics, a new engine had to be developed by Kojima and his team. A gameplay demo was first revealed to the public at the 1996 Tokyo Game Show, and was later shown on day 2 of E3 1997 as a short video. The game was released to critical acclaim. Many outlets noted the game's cinematic qualities and innovative stealth gameplay. Kojima became a celebrity in video game news media, and was surprised when he began to be recognized in public.

In early 2001, Kojima released the first details of the sequel to Metal Gear Solid, Metal Gear Solid 2: Sons of Liberty, for the PlayStation 2. The game's highly detailed graphics, physics, and expanded gameplay quickly made it one of the most anticipated games at the time. The game was highly successful and critically acclaimed at release, due to its graphics, gameplay, and storyline, which dealt with myriad philosophical themes as specific as memes, censorship, manipulation, patricide, the inherent flaws of democracy and as grandiose as the nature of reality itself. While Metal Gear Solid 2 appealed to gamers with the discussion of these, the bewildering maze of dialogue and plot revelation in the final hours of the game was a disappointment for many gamers, who expected the Hollywood-style resolution of its forerunner.

Before Metal Gear Solid 2 was released, Kojima produced the game and anime franchise Zone of the Enders in 2001 to moderate success. In 2003, he produced Boktai: The Sun Is in Your Hand for the Game Boy Advance, which players take the role of a young vampire hunter who uses a solar weapon which is charged by a photometric sensor on the game cartridge, forcing them to play in sunlight. Another team inside Konami, in a collaboration with Silicon Knights, began work on Metal Gear Solid: The Twin Snakes, a GameCube enhanced remake of the first Metal Gear Solid with all the gameplay features of Metal Gear Solid 2 and with cutscenes redirected by director Ryuhei Kitamura.

Afterwards, Kojima designed and released Metal Gear Solid 3: Snake Eater for the PlayStation 2. Unlike the previous games in the series, which took place in the near future and focused on indoor locations, the game is set in a Soviet jungle during the height of the Cold War in 1964, and features wilderness survival, camouflage, and James Bond styled espionage. The North American version was released on November 17, 2004, with the Japanese counterpart following on December 16. The European version was released on March 4, 2005. Critical response to the game was highly favorable. Kojima has said that his mother played it, "It took her an entire year to complete Metal Gear Solid 3. She would get her friends to help her. When she defeated The End, [a character the player faces off during the game] she called me up and said: 'It is finished'."

At that time, Kojima produced Boktais sequel, Boktai 2: Solar Boy Django for the Game Boy Advance. Released in summer 2004, it makes more extensive use of the cartridge's sunlight sensor and allows players to combine various new solar weapons. Also released was Metal Gear Acid for the PlayStation Portable handheld. A turn-based game, it is less action-oriented than the other Metal Gear games and focuses more on strategy. It was released in Japan on December 16, 2004. Its sequel, Metal Gear Acid 2, was released on March 21, 2006.

Kojima wanted Solid Snake to appear in Super Smash Bros. Melee, but Nintendo refused, due to development cycle problems. When Super Smash Bros. Brawl was in development, series director Masahiro Sakurai contacted Kojima to work and add Snake and content related to the Metal Gear series, including a stage based on Shadow Moses Island (the main setting of Solid), into the game.

Released in June 2008, Kojima co-directed Metal Gear Solid 4: Guns of the Patriots with Shuyo Murata. Initially, Kojima was not going to direct it, but death threats made the team nervous and he decided to work with them. Kojima received a lifetime achievement award at the MTV Game Awards 2008 in Germany. In his speech, he said in English, "I have to say, even though I received this award, let me state that I will not retire. I will continue to create games as long as I live".

Before E3 2009, Kojima stated interest in working with a Western developer. This later turned out to be a collaboration between him and Spanish developer MercurySteam to work on Castlevania: Lords of Shadow.

Although he announced that Metal Gear Solid 4: Guns of the Patriots would be the last Metal Gear game he would be directly involved in, he announced at E3 2009 that he would return to help on two Metal Gear games: Metal Gear Rising: Revengeance, as a producer and Metal Gear Solid: Peace Walker as writer, director, and producer. When interviewed at Gamescom 2009, Kojima stated that he got more involved with Peace Walker because "there was a lot of confusion within the team and it didn't proceed as I wanted it to. Therefore I thought that I needed to jump in and do Peace Walker".

Kojima was at E3 2010 to show off his team's latest project, Metal Gear Rising: Revengeance. He was also seen in Nintendo's 3DS interview video, where he stated he was interested in making a Metal Gear Solid game for the 3DS and wondered what it would be like in 3D. This game ended up being a remake of Metal Gear Solid 3 titled Metal Gear Solid: Snake Eater 3D. In late 2011, Metal Gear Solid: Rising was renamed Metal Gear Rising: Revengeance with PlatinumGames being involved in developing it alongside Kojima Productions. Nevertheless, Kojima is the game's executive producer and showed interest in working in the game's demo. Kojima was satisfied with the final product and expressed the possibility of a sequel if Platinum were to develop it.

On April 1, 2011, Kojima was promoted to Executive Vice President and Corporate Officer in Konami Digital Entertainment. At E3 2011, he revealed his new innovative gaming technology labeled as "transfarring", a portmanteau of the verbs transferring and sharing. The technology enables gamers to transfer their gaming data from the PlayStation 3 to PlayStation Portable in a quick data transferring process and bring it on the go from home into the outside world.

Later that year, he stated he was working on a new intellectual property with Goichi Suda, tentatively titled Project S, and preparing new projects. On July 8, 2011, Kojima announced that Project S was a radio-show sequel to Snatcher, titled Sdatcher as a reference to the show's producer Suda. The show would air on Fridays on Kojima's bi-weekly Internet radio show, starting with episode No. 300 which was broadcast in August 2011. In October, Kojima announced that he would be collaborating with Suda and 5pb. director Chiyomaru Shikura in producing a new adventure game visual novel. It was initially speculated that the game would be the third entry in 5pb.'s Science Adventure series, but it was later confirmed to be a separate title. The game was planned to have an overseas release and an anime adaption. As of 2018, no further news regarding the project has been released.

Final Konami projects and departure (2012–2015) 

In mid-2012 and in the following years after Kojima finished work on the Fox Engine, Kojima has been connected to the Silent Hill series. During this time, he indicated that he was interested in making a Silent Hill game and the first instance of this was on August 18, 2012. He described his excitement regarding the potential use of the Fox Engine on the eighth generation platforms via a tweet of an image of the DVD for the Silent Hill film: Later, he added what he had in mind for this game in a series of tweets: "Silent Hill is in closed room setting and doesn’t require full action so that we can focus on the graphic quality. Enemies featured in the game do not have to be consistent or move fast. It only requires scariness by graphics and presentation. As being a creator, making action games in an open world setting, such a type of game is very enviously attractive. If only someone could create this on the Fox Engine." After a while, and as a result of Kojima's interest in making a Silent Hill game, Konami asked him to do so. Kojima explained the story in an interview with Eurogamer:

Additionally, in an interview with Geoff Keighley, when a fan asked "which game do you want to direct or reboot?" Kojima stated without hesitation, Silent Hill. Keighley jumped in and asked "What do you want to do with Silent Hill?" Kojima responded: "A guy [like myself] that is such a chicken and is so easily scared – making a scary game – I'm very confident that something horrifying would come out from that. But on the other hand I would have to prepare myself to have nightmares every single day. Hopefully sometime in the future I'm able to work on this, but I would really need to prepare to have daily nightmares". In August 2014, PT was released on the PlayStation Store and revealed that a new game in the Silent Hill franchise titled Silent Hills was being directed by Kojima for the PlayStation 4, alongside Mexican film director Guillermo del Toro. In April 2015, the playable teaser was removed and the game was cancelled.

At the 2013 Game Developers Conference, Kojima unveiled Metal Gear Solid V: The Phantom Pain, which was set to be his final Metal Gear game, noting that this time unlike previous announcements that he had stopped working on the series, was very serious about leaving; it was preceded by Metal Gear Solid V: Ground Zeroes, a shorter game released in 2014 and serving as a prologue to The Phantom Pain. In March 2015, reports began to surface that Kojima would part ways with longtime publisher Konami after the release of The Phantom Pain. Konami later stated that they were auditioning for new staff for future Metal Gear titles and removed Kojima's name from the series' marketing material. Despite reports that Kojima left the company in October 2015, a spokesman for Konami stated that he was "taking a long time off from work." At The Game Awards 2015, Metal Gear Solid V won the awards for Best Action Game and Best Score/Soundtrack, but Kojima did not attend the event, being reportedly barred from attending by Konami. Instead, the award was accepted by Kiefer Sutherland on his behalf. On July 10, 2015, regular Kojima collaborator Akio Ōtsuka revealed that Konami had closed Kojima Productions.

Independent studio and Death Stranding (2015–present) 

On December 16, 2015, Kojima announced that Kojima Productions would be re-established as an independent studio, partnered with Sony Computer Entertainment, and that his first game would be exclusive to PlayStation 4. At E3 2016, Kojima personally announced the game's title as Death Stranding in a trailer. The trailer featured Norman Reedus, whom Kojima had previously worked with in the canceled Silent Hills.

Kojima launched his own YouTube channel in 2016, where he and film critic Kenji Yano discuss their favorite films and matters pertaining to Kojima's studio. Starting in 2017, Kojima became a regular contributor to Rolling Stone, often discussing recent film releases, and occasionally drawing comparisons to his own works.

Death Stranding was released on November 8, 2019, and received generally positive reviews and was a commercial success. It also won a number of awards, including "Best Game Direction" and "Best Score/Music" at The Game Awards 2019.

In November 2019, talking to BBC Newsbeat as part of a documentary about Death Stranding, Kojima said “In the future Kojima Productions will start making films. If you can do one thing well, then you can do everything well”. Kojima went on to explain that he sees that movies, TV shows, and games competing in the same space in the future, thanks to streaming technology, and that this will encourage new formats to emerge. “I’m very interested in the new format of game that will appear on there and that’s what I want to take on,” Kojima added.

In June 2022, Kojima and Microsoft revealed that Kojima Productions would be working on a game with Xbox Game Studios that will use Microsoft's cloud-based tech. Norman Reedus, in an interview, also confirmed that development for a sequel to Death Stranding had started.

In 2022, Kojima began a podcast for Spotify called Hideo Kojima presents Brain Structure. The podcast, hosted by Kojima with regular appearances from Geoff Keighley, focuses on Kojima's history with game development, as well as his interests in books, music, and cinema.

At several game expos in 2022, Kojima has cryptically teased the casting of an upcoming game being developed by Kojima Productions, with Elle Fanning and Shioli Kutsuna confirmed to star. It was unknown whether the game will be related to Death Stranding, the aforementioned Xbox collaboration, or an entirely different project. However, at The Game Awards 2022, Kojima officially revealed the game as the sequel to Death Stranding, with the working title Death Stranding 2. Norman Reedus, Léa Seydoux, and Troy Baker will be returning from the titular game, with Elle Fanning and Shioli Kutsuna revealed to be the new cast members of the game.

Influences and mentality
Kojima has cited Yuji Horii's The Portopia Serial Murder Case (1983) and Shigeru Miyamoto's Super Mario Bros. (1985) as the games that inspired him to enter the video game industry. Portopia Serial Murder Case, a murder mystery adventure game, was an important influence because, according to Kojima, it had "mystery, a 3D dungeon, humor, and a proper background and explanation of why the murderer committed the crime. That is why there was drama in this game. My encountering this game expanded the potential of video games in my mind." Portopia had an influence on his early works, including Metal Gear and particularly Snatcher.

Kojima's love of film is noticeable in his games where he pays homage through his stories and characters, sometimes to the point of pastiche, as in Snatcher. He cited a contrast between films and games as while in his games he intends to portray violence like in a movie, in the game it is up to the player to decide. He wants people to understand the effects of violence. As he considers the games too stressful, he also wants comic relief to contrast it.

Snatcher is inspired by many science fiction films, particularly from the 1980s, including Blade Runner, Akira, The Thing, Invasion of the Body Snatchers, and The Terminator. Examples of influence by films include Solid Snake's codename (named after Snake Plissken from Escape from New York), Snake's alias in MGS2: Pliskin (in reference to the last name of Snake Plissken from the Escape movies), Snake's real name (Dave from 2001: A Space Odyssey), and Snake's trademark bandana (The Deer Hunter).

Film would also have an influence on other aspects of his games. Hal "Otacon" Emmerich (named after HAL 9000 from 2001: A Space Odyssey and film director Roland Emmerich), Sniper Wolf shooting Meryl in Metal Gear Solid (Full Metal Jacket), Psycho Mantis (inspired from the film The Fury), and the whole Metal Gear stealth concept (The Great Escape and The Guns of Navarone). James Bond also had a large influence on the Metal Gear series, with Metal Gear Solid 3 having a James Bond-like introduction sequence. Kojima has written that Metal Gear was "strongly influenced" by the "anti-war and anti-nuke" themes of the Planet of the Apes film franchise.

In an article he wrote for Official PlayStation 2 Magazine, Kojima described the influence of the film Dawn of the Dead on the Metal Gear series. The zombie classic inspired "the maximum three-dimensional use of a closed area like a shopping mall with elevators, air ducts, and escalators". These aspects are similar enough in his view that "Metal Gear Solid is Dawn of the Dead if you replace soldiers with zombies ."

He also received inspiration from anime. His early works, particularly the cyberpunk adventure game Snatcher (which uses anime-style art), were influenced by cyberpunk anime, most notably Akira (mentioned above). In an interview, he mentioned that his Zone of the Enders series was inspired by mecha/robot anime, such as Neon Genesis Evangelion. Mecha anime was also an inspiration for the Metal Gear series, which features mecha robots, such as Metal Gear REX and Metal Gear RAY; this is referenced in Metal Gear Solid, where Otacon mentions mecha anime as an influence on his Metal Gear REX designs.

In regards to storyline development and interaction with them, he said:

In 2019 Kojima published a collection of essays in Japan discussing the influence of pop culture on his work under the title The Gifted Gene and My Lovable Memes. The book was published in English by Viz Media in October 2021 under the title The Creative Gene: How books, movies, and music inspired the creator of Death Stranding and Metal Gear Solid.

In terms of reverse influence on film, his work on the storylines of the Metal Gear series was cited as an influence by screenwriter David Hayter, the voice actor for Solid Snake, on his screenwriting for Hollywood films. He stated that "Kojima and I have different styles (...) but I've certainly learned things from him, especially about ambiguity and telling a story without giving all the answers".

Kojima has also influenced a number of actors and auteurs in the film industry. Hollywood actors Mads Mikkelsen and Léa Seydoux have voice roles in Death Stranding, and celebrated director Guillermo del Toro is amongst his biggest fans.

In 2020, Kojima was a member of the international Jury of the 77th Venice International Film Festival, Virtual Reality section.

Legacy 
Kojima has been noted for predicting and exploring themes in his works years before they gained mainstream notoriety on numerous occasions, ranging from the sociological to the scientific.

The main example of this pertains to the plot and themes of Metal Gear Solid 2: Sons of Liberty, released on November 13, 2001, which delved into ideas and concepts that would become culturally significant in the 2010s. Among these themes were post-truth politics, alternative facts, echo-chambers, fake news, AI-curated news feeds, information overload in the Information Age, and political correctness. While the game received universal acclaim upon release for its gameplay and attention to detail, the plot became a divisive topic among critics, with some calling it "absurd" and "stupid". Reinterpretations of the game's plot began to surface in the 2010s, with some calling it "misunderstood" in its time, eerily prescient, and "necessary for the political climate to come" for predicting some of the cultural issues of the 2010s with striking accuracy and similar concepts. GamesRadar+ has cited the prescience of the game in relation to the Facebook–Cambridge Analytica data scandal and the Russian interference in the 2016 United States elections. The concept of "Selection for Societal Sanity" presented in the game was one of the bases for the paper Filtration Failure: On Selection for Societal Sanity written by Adrian Mróz and published in the academic journal Kultura i Historia.

In Metal Gear Solid V: The Phantom Pain, released on September 1, 2015, the Wolbachia bacteria is used to halt the reproduction of the fictional "vocal chords parasite". At the time, large-scale uses of Wolbachia to control insect-transmitted diseases like malaria and dengue only existed in simulated computational models and field-test releases in Australia. Deployment of Wolbachia was proposed the next year at the peak of the Zika epidemic in the Americas. Large-scale deployments of the Wolbachia bacteria became the most effective way to control and eradicate mosquito-related epidemics as of 2019, with successful deployments in Malaysia, Singapore, Sri Lanka, Indonesia, Vietnam, and Brazil.

In Death Stranding, released on November 8, 2019, Kojima presents a post-apocalyptic setting in which people live isolated in cities and prepper shelters, unable to go outside because of the hazardous conditions brought by an event named the "Death Stranding". Thus, the inhabitants of the world rely on "porters", people who risk their lives making deliveries, to receive and exchange the resources they need to survive. Similarities with the COVID-19 pandemic were noted by numerous journalists in early 2020, including the game's focus on the themes of isolation, loneliness, and political divide.

Personal life
Kojima is private about his personal life. He has at least one brother. His father Kingo Kojima died when he was 13 and his mother died in early 2017. According to his book The Creative Gene, he has two sons, both of which have inspired Kojima to expand his franchises to a more accessible demographic, such as requesting Super Smash Bros director Masahiro Sakurai to implement the character of Solid Snake into the franchise.

Misrepresentation in the assassination of Shinzo Abe
Kojima was misidentified in July 2022 as the assassin of former Japanese Prime Minister Shinzo Abe by some news outlets and politicians. Greek news outlet ANT1, Iranian news website Mashregh News and French politician  all mistakenly used pictures of Kojima instead of the killer; Rieu subsequently apologized for the misidentification, and ANT1 took down its YouTube video with the picture. The man suspected by Japanese investigators to be Abe's assassin is Tetsuya Yamagami, a 41-year-old  Japan Maritime Self-Defense Force veteran. Kojima Productions said that it would be considering legal action in response to the pictorial misidentifications.

Awards and accolades
Newsweek named Kojima as one of the top ten people of 2002. In 2008, Next-Gen placed him seventh in their list of "Hot 100 Developers 2008."

In 2009, IGN placed him sixth in their list of top game creators of all time. At the 2008 MTV Game Awards, Kojima was given the award show's first Lifetime Achievement Award for a game designer and was also honored with a Lifetime Achievement Award at the 2009 Game Developers Conference. In 2014, UNESCO's Bradford City of Film gave Kojima the inaugural award for Cinematography in Videogames, "for his astounding directing, storytelling, and cinematography" in video games.

At the 2014 National Academy of Video Game Trade Reviewers (NAVGTR) awards, Kojima was credited for Metal Gear Solid V: Ground Zeroes''' nomination for the category Game, Franchise Adventure. In December 2015, Kojima was invited to accept an award from The Game Awards 2015 for Metal Gear Solid V: The Phantom Pain, but was prevented from attending by Konami.

In February 2016, Kojima received the AIAS Hall of Fame Award at the 19th Annual D.I.C.E. Awards. In December 2016, Kojima was able to attend The Game Awards 2016 and accepted the Industry Icon Award.

On October 12, 2017, he received a Lifetime Achievement Award at the Brasil Game Show.

Kojima was named a BAFTA Fellowship in 2020, to be awarded to him during the British Academy Games Awards in April 2020, making him the second Japanese person to receive the award for work on video games after Shigeru Miyamoto.

Kojima holds the distinction of having directed four games (Metal Gear Solid 4: Guns of the Patriots, Metal Gear Solid: Peace Walker, Metal Gear Solid V: The Phantom Pain, and Death Stranding'') out of the 27 total to have achieved a maximum possible score of 40 from the Japanese video games magazine Famitsu.

On January 20, 2022 Kojima received an Industry Legend Award from the Arab Game Awards.

On March 15, 2022, Kojima announced on Twitter that he had received the 72nd Minister of Education Award for Fine Arts from the Japanese Agency of Cultural Affairs.

Works

Games

Canceled games

Literary works

Actor roles

Video games

Film and TV

Other

References

External links

 Hideo Kojima's former blog
 

 
1963 births
Living people
20th-century Japanese writers
21st-century Japanese writers
Academy of Interactive Arts & Sciences Hall of Fame inductees
BAFTA fellows
Game Developers Conference Lifetime Achievement Award recipients
Japanese video game designers
Japanese video game directors
Japanese video game producers
Konami people
People from Setagaya
Video game writers
Writers from Tokyo